Tongin Market is a traditional market in Tongin-dong, Jongno-gu, Seoul. Established in 1941, the market originally catered for local needs. Today it is home to around 75 stalls and shops such as sit-in restaurants, take-away street food and vendors of  every-day goods. The market is located at 18, Jahamun-ro 15-gil, Jongno-gu in Seoul.

History  
Tongin Market was built in 1941 as a market for the Japanese in the vicinity of Hyoja-dong and near the Gyeongbok Palace, and after the Korean War, as the population grew in the Sogong area, the market expanded.

In 2005, it was registered as a legitimate market according to the special law for the promotion of the traditional market and then equipped with modernization facilities. In 2010, it was selected as the 'Seoul Culture Market' hosted by Seoul City and Jongno-gu.

In 2011, the market started a rejuvenation programme that saw the introduction of yeopjeon brass coins as means of payment on the market. The number of stores is about 70 across food stalls and goods vendors. The programme resulted in growing visitor numbers and started to attract tourists.

References

External links 
 Official website

Retail markets in Seoul
1941 establishments in Korea